William Dow Duncan (11 June 1892 – 14 December 1961) was a New Zealand rugby player. He played eleven games with the All Blacks.

References 

1892 births
1961 deaths
New Zealand rugby union players
New Zealand international rugby union players
People from Port Chalmers
Rugby union hookers
Rugby union players from Otago